Al-Hilal English School is a not-for-profit school in Manki, Karnataka, which was founded in 1989 by  Mr Jafar Sadiq Shahbandri and S.M Iqbal Shahbandri lay the foundational ground for the school with the support and initial encouragement from Late Mr. Hajika Sawood and is managed by the Tarbiat Education Society. The school started off as a private venture but eventually partial control was passed to the Government. It covers ages 3 –18.

History
Al-Hilal English School was founded in 1989 by two brothers of manki village who aimed to enlighten the purpose of educational enrichment to the people of manki. Mr Jafar Sadiq Shahbandri and S.M Iqbal Shahbandri lay the foundational ground for the school with the support and initial encouragement from Late Hajika Sawood. It started with a block accommodating Lower Kindergarten and Upper Kindergarten. The campus was expanded over the years in line with the increasing population. Now it is LKG to 10th Standard and is set to have a block for pre-university college within the campus.

The population of Manki, Honnavar is 11,000, but the people were lagging behind in educational opportunity compared to surrounding places such as Bhatkal, Honnavara, and Murudeshwara. That changed when the school was established.

Roll
The present strength of the school is 450 students.

Buildings and grounds
The school has a school building of 8000 square feet, a play ground, a mosque and a residential building for teachers.

References 

http://www.mankirocks.webs.com
https://archive.today/20130223091131/http://alhilalschool.org/About%20Us.aspx
http://www.bhatkallys.org/index.php?option=com_content&view=article&id=3160:manki-al-hilal-school-hosts-zonal-level-sports-meet-&catid=82:local&Itemid=459
http://www.facebook.com/masak54
http://www.daijiworld.com/news/news_disp.asp?n_id=114566
https://web.archive.org/web/20040910071832/http://meltingpot.fortunecity.com/guam/385/nawayat.htm

Schools in Uttara Kannada district
Educational institutions established in 1989
1989 establishments in Karnataka